This list of Mayors of Slough starts with the first elected Mayor, who was also the Charter Mayor named in the first Royal Charter when Slough became a Municipal Borough in 1938 (having previously been an Urban District).

Slough is a town in the South East England region of the United Kingdom. Until 1974 it was part of the Administrative county of Buckinghamshire and thereafter it was in the county of Berkshire. From 1998 it has been a unitary authority.

Since 1938 there has been a Mayor of Slough elected at the annual meeting in every municipal year, by and from the members of the Borough Council.

The start of what was originally the 1947-48 municipal year was changed from November 1948 to May 1949, so that Alderman Taylor's second term as Mayor lasted for about 18 months.

In 1986 Councillor Back became the first Mayor to die in office. Councillor Gibbs was elected to fill the vacancy for the remainder of the 1985-86 municipal year. He was re-elected for the 1986-87 municipal year.

In 2015 Councillor Chaudhry became the first Mayor of Slough to resign during his term of office. For the remainder of the 2014-15 municipal year, the office of Mayor was left vacant. Councillor Rasib, the Deputy Mayor for 2014-15, presided over Council meetings in that capacity until he was elected Mayor for the 2015-16 municipal year.

Municipal borough
Terms of the Mayors of the Municipal Borough of Slough.

Borough
Terms of the Mayors of the Borough of Slough

External links
 Slough Borough Council website - Mayor of Slough accessed 14 July 2012

References
 Slough Council Minutes, collection available in the Slough Central Library

Government and politics of Slough
Slough
Berkshire-related lists
Slough